Jennifer Diane Grant (born February 26, 1966) is an American actress. The daughter of actors Cary Grant and Dyan Cannon, she is best known for roles in the television series Beverly Hills, 90210 and Movie Stars.

Early life 
Grant was born in Burbank, California, to actors Dyan Cannon and Cary Grant. Her parents divorced when she was only two years old. Jennifer had a close relationship with her father for the rest of his life. 

Partly because her father did not want her to become an actress, she tried other things for several years. As a teenager during high school at Brentwood School in Los Angeles and on break from college, she worked as a babysitter, stock clerk at the Village store in Pacific Palisades, grocery store checkout cashier at the Rainbow Grocery in Malibu, and waitress at the Pioneer Boulangerie restaurant in Santa Monica. After graduating from Stanford University in 1987 with a degree in American Studies, she worked for a law firm, and followed that with a job as a chef at Wolfgang Puck's Spago restaurant in Beverly Hills.  When her father died in 1986, he left her half of his $60 million estate; the other half of the estate went to her stepmother Barbara Harris.

Career 
In 1993, seven years after her father's death, Grant played her first acting role in the Aaron Spelling television drama Beverly Hills, 90210, in the recurring role of Celeste Lundy. She appeared as a guest star in a variety of shows including Friends, and later appeared in several movies. In 1999, she was the lead actress in the WB television sitcom Movie Stars.

Grant's memoir, Good Stuff: A Reminiscence of My Father, Cary Grant (2011), is a portrait of her relationship with her father, who was 62 when she was born and who died 20 years later. The title refers to a favorite expression of his, said in reference to things he approved of or situations he was happy about.

Personal life 
Grant has two children, a son, Cary (born 2008), and a daughter, Davian (born 2011). She was previously married to director Randy Zisk from 1993 to 1996.

Grant has volunteered as an actress and mentor with the Young Storytellers Foundation.

Filmography

Film

Television

References

External links 
 
 Sampling of photos from the book Good Stuff, Alfred A. Knopf/Random House, publisher.

1966 births
20th-century American actresses
21st-century American actresses
American film actresses
American television actresses
American people of English descent
American people of Russian-Jewish descent
Actresses from Burbank, California
Living people
Stanford University alumni